Sơn Trà Mountain, also known as Monkey Mountain, is a mountain and peninsula range located on Sơn Trà Peninsula, in Sơn Trà district, Đà Nẵng, Vietnam, overlooking the Bay of Da Nang and the East Sea. Đà Nẵng Port's Tiên Sa Terminal is located at the base of the mountain's western face, as is nearby Tiên Sa Beach. 

The site is notable as a natural reserve and tourism location to the nearby city. The site is a habitat for many endangered species notably the Red-shanked douc langur, with over 60% of the species located on the mountain range. In 1977 the site was designated a nationally protected forest following the takeover of the site by the newly unified government. Currently, the site is undergoing significant and in many cases illegal development, with plots of land illegally being transferred to developers by local governments for constructing hotels and venues.

Y Pha Nho Cemetery 
Located on Yet Kieu Road, just before Tien Sa port gates. It is a collective graveyard for French and Spanish soldiers who died in the Franco-Spanish expedition under the command of Admiral Charles Rigault de Genouilly in the first failed attempt to conquer Tourane (Da Nang now) from 1858 to 1860.

The cemetery consists of a small white chapel, with a modest shrine inside and 32 large and unlabeled small sized graves. Inscribed inside the chapel there is a commemorative plaque with the following inscription:

"A la Memoire des combattants Français et de l'Expédition Espagnols Rigault de Genouilly. Mort en 1858-59-60 en lieux et ensevelissement”.

"To the memory of French and Spanish soldiers of the expedition of Rigault de Genouilly. Died in 1858-59-60 and buried here".

The cemetery was inaugurated in 1898.

Linh Ung Pagoda 
Linh Ung Pagoda is located in an area known locally as Bai But or Buddha's Sanctuary towards Hoang Sa road. It is the largest pagoda in Central Vietnam.

Lady Buddha Da Nang statue is inside Linh Ung pagoda courtyard with a height of 67m, being the tallest Buddha statue in Vietnam. It can virtually be seen from every corner of Da Nang, becoming an attractive tourist site of the city.

Ban Co Peak 

Ban Co (Chessboard in English) peak is the highest mountain in Son Tra peninsula, standing at nearly 600 m above sea level. From Ban Co peak, visitors can enjoy spectacular panoramic views over the entire Da Nang city, Hai Van pass, Lien Chieu bay, Ba Na Hills, Cham islands and the sea far away.

Historical US Military Usage
Monkey Mountain Facility, a U.S. military communications facility during the Vietnam War was located on the mountain, while another base Camp Tien Sha is now part of the Tiên Sa Terminal. Due to its proximity to Da Nang Air Base/International Airport and Marble Mountain Air Facility, the mountain was the scene of several aircraft crashes during the Vietnam War:
11 December 1964: A Republic of Vietnam Air Force C-123B (#55-4522) crashed into the mountain shortly after takeoff from Da Nang Air Base killing all 38 on board.
26 October 1965: two F-4B Phantoms of VMFA-115 returning to Da Nang Air Base from a mission crashed into the side of the mountain killing all four crewmembers.
19 February 1968: a CH-53A #65-055 of HMH-463 crashed into the mountain killing all 13 personnel on board.
24 March 1968: an F-8 Crusader Bu 150306 from VF-53 crashed into the side of the mountain, the pilot ejected successfully and the rear fuselage of the jet which embedded in the mountain became a popular photo opportunity for military personnel.

References

External links
 Son Tra mountain

Mountains of Vietnam
Landforms of Da Nang